Marlyne Nayokah Barrett (née Afflack: born September 13, 1978) is an American actress. She had a recurring role from 2006 to 2008 as Nerese Campbell in the HBO crime drama The Wire and in 2007, she had a recurring role as Felicia Marquand in the FX legal drama Damages. In 2015, she began starring as Head Charge Nurse Maggie Lockwood in the NBC medical drama Chicago Med.

Life and career
Barrett was born as Marlyne Nayokah Afflack in Brooklyn, New York. She began her career appearing on stage and television, before she co-starred with Hill Harper in the 2003 romantic comedy Love, Sex and Eating the Bones. In the late 90s, she was a VJ for the TV station Musique Plus in Montreal, Canada. Later in 2000s, Barrett had a number of guest starring television roles on the New York City-filmed dramas, include the NBC police procedural drama  Law & Order and its spin-offs Law & Order: Special Victims Unit, Law & Order: Trial by Jury and the short-lived NBC legal drama Conviction. From 2006 to 2008, she played Nerese Campbell in the HBO crime drama The Wire, and in 2007 also had a recurring role as attorney Felicia Marquand in the FX legal drama Damages. In 2009, Barrett co-starred as Thomasina, the efficient palace secretary and aide-de-camp, on the short-lived NBC drama Kings.

In 2015, Barrett returned to television appearing as Det. Chris Thompson in the first two episodes of the ABC crime drama American Crime. Later that year, she was cast as Nurse Maggie Lockwood in the NBC medical drama Chicago Med. She was credited in the recurring cast in the first thirteen episodes and was added to the main cast in the fourteenth episode.

Personal life
She is married to Gavin Barrett, a pastor, and they have two children.
On September 27, 2022, Barrett announced that she had been diagnosed with uterine and ovarian cancer, and that she was undergoing "aggressive" chemotherapy treatment to fight the disease, before undergoing a hysterectomy procedure later in the year.

Filmography

Film

Television

References

External links

American television actresses
Actresses of Haitian descent
Living people
1978 births
People from Brooklyn
21st-century American actresses
American expatriate actresses in Canada
Actresses from New York City
20th-century American actresses